Under the Big Top is a 1938 American film directed by Karl Brown.

Plot 
A trapeze artist girl in a circus is persistently demanded by her aunt to be the best in the business. She falls in love with one of the men in her trapeze act, but her mother works to break up the romance. Then another trapeze artist falls in love with her and also works to break up the romance.

Cast 
Marjorie Main as Sara Post
Anne Nagel as Penny
Jack La Rue as Ricardo Le Grande
Grant Richards as Pablo Le Grande
Fred 'Snowflake' Toones as Juba
Betty Compson as Marie
Herbert Rawlinson as Herman
George Cleveland as Joe
Rolfe Sedan as Pierre
Charlene Wyatt as Penny - as a child
Harry Harvey as McCarthy

External links 

 TMC Under the Big Top 

1938 films
1938 romantic drama films
American romantic drama films
Circus films
American black-and-white films
Monogram Pictures films
1930s English-language films
1930s American films